Grusse is a former commune in the Jura department in Bourgogne-Franche-Comté in eastern France. On 1 January 2017, it was merged into the new commune Val-Sonnette.

Population

See also
 Communes of the Jura department

References

Former communes of Jura (department)
Populated places disestablished in 2017
2017 disestablishments in France